Kajana Sign Language (Kajana Gebarentaal) is a village sign language of Suriname.  It is spoken in Kajana, a village of just three families.

References

Village sign languages
Languages of Suriname